Susan is a feminine given name.

Susan may also refer to:

People
Susan (Iranian singer) (1942–2004), pop singer of the 1960s and 1970s
Susan (Japanese singer), pop singer of the early 1980s
 Susan, Lady Renouf (1942–2016), Australian socialite
 Susan, Lady St Helier (1845–1931), London County Council alderman
 List of people named Susan

Places
 Susa, an ancient city in Iran
 Susan, Virginia, U.S.
 Susan District, an administrative subdivision of Iran
 Lake Susan, a lake in Minnesota, U.S.
 Port Susan, Washington, U.S.

Other uses
 Susan (1813 ship), a British merchant and convict ship
 Susan (dog) (1944–1959), a Pembroke Corgi dog owned by British Queen Elizabeth II
 Susan (film), a 2018 British film by Mahmoud Shoolizadeh
 "Susan" (song), a 1967 song by the Buckinghams
 Typhoon Susan, index of tropical cyclones of this name

See also
 
 Black-eyed Susan (disambiguation)
 Lazy Susan